Harri Lauri Linnonmaa (born July 30, 1946 in Helsinki, Finland) is a retired professional ice hockey player who played in the SM-liiga. He played for HJK and HIFK. He was inducted into the Finnish Hockey Hall of Fame in 1991.

External links
 Finnish Hockey Hall of Fame bio
 

1946 births
Living people
HIFK (ice hockey) players
Ice hockey players at the 1972 Winter Olympics
Olympic ice hockey players of Finland
Ice hockey people from Helsinki